Munthir Khalaf (1 July 1970 – 14 March 2008) was an Iraqi football midfielder who played for Iraq at the 1994 World Cup qualification. He played for the national team between 1992 and 1993.

Khalaf was assassinated in front of his home at the Yarmouk area in Baghdad on 14 March 2008.

Career statistics

International goals
Scores and results list Iraq's goal tally first.

References

2008 deaths
Iraqi footballers
Iraq international footballers
Association football midfielders
1970 births